The 1982 Colgate Red Raiders football team was an American football team that represented Colgate University as an independent during the 1982 NCAA Division I-AA football season. Colgate ranked No. 9 nationally and qualified for the Division I-AA playoffs, but lost in the quarterfinal round.

In its seventh season under head coach Frederick Dunlap, the team compiled a 8–4 record (7–3 regular season). Dave Wolf and Mark Owens were the team captains. 

This was Colgate's first year in Division I-AA, after having competed in the top-level Division I-A and its predecessors since 1890.

A five-game winning streak to open the campaign put the Red Raiders in the weekly national rankings in their first year in Division I-AA, rising as high as No. 2. A three-game losing streak then bounced them out of the rankings, but Colgate finished the year at No. 9 and qualified for the Division I-AA playoffs, where it lost in the quarterfinals. 

The team played its home games at Andy Kerr Stadium in Hamilton, New York.

Schedule

References

Colgate
Colgate Raiders football seasons
Colgate Red Raiders football